Rubus semisetosus is a North American species of bristleberry in section Setosi of the genus Rubus, a member of the rose family. It grows in the Canadian Province of Nova Scotia as well as in the northeastern and north-central United States from New England to Minnesota.

References

semisetosus
Plants described in 1907
Flora of Nova Scotia
Flora of the United States
Flora without expected TNC conservation status